The 4 arrondissements of the Martinique department are:

 Arrondissement of Fort-de-France, (prefecture of the Martinique department: Fort-de-France) with 4 communes.  The population of the arrondissement was 157,449 in 2016.
 Arrondissement of Le Marin, (subprefecture: Le Marin) with 12 communes.  The population of the arrondissement was 117,168 in 2016.
 Arrondissement of Saint-Pierre, (subprefecture: Saint-Pierre) with 8 communes.  The population of the arrondissement was 22,926 in 2016.
 Arrondissement of La Trinité, (subprefecture: La Trinité) with 10 communes.  The population of the arrondissement was 78,937 in 2016.

History

At the creation of the department of Martinique in 1947, its only arrondissement was Fort-de-France. The arrondissement of La Trinité, containing 10 communes that were previously part of the arrondissement of Fort-de-France, was created in 1965. The arrondissement of Le Marin, containing 12 communes that were previously part of the arrondissement of Fort-de-France, was created in 1974. The arrondissement of Saint-Pierre, containing eight communes that were previously part of the arrondissement of Fort-de-France, was created in 1995.

See also
Cantons of the Martinique department
Communes of the Martinique department

References

Martinique
 
Martinique 1